Orowe (Ôrôê, Boewe, Neukaledonien) is an Oceanic language of New Caledonia.

References

New Caledonian languages
Languages of New Caledonia
Definitely endangered languages